The Airbase is a black-and-white British sitcom that was broadcast on BBC1 in 1965. It was written by John Briley.

Cast
David Kelsey – Sqn Ldr Terence Elgin Heatherton
David Healy – Staff Sgt. George Tillman Miller
Eddie Matthews – Airman Randy Ricks
Alan Gifford – Colonel Hoggart

Plot
The American writer John Briley wrote this sitcom from his own experiences as a soldier stationed in England. The lead character is Sqn Ldr Heatherton who is the commanding officer at RAF Wittlethorpe. Much of his time is taken up by him being the middle man between the local community and his US airmen.

Episodes
Episode One (24 March 1965)
Episode Two (31 March 1965)
Episode Three (7 April 1965)
Episode Four (14 April 1965)
Episode Five (21 April 1965)
Episode Six (28 April 1965)

No episodes are known to exist in the BBC's archives as of 2009; the show was presumably wiped in the early 1970s.

References
Mark Lewisohn, "Radio Times Guide to TV Comedy", BBC Worldwide Ltd, 2003

External links 
 

1965 British television series debuts
1965 British television series endings
1960s British sitcoms
1960s British workplace comedy television series
BBC television sitcoms
Lost BBC episodes